Docphin is a mobile and web platform for medical professionals.  Launched in May 2012, Docphin helps medical professionals access medical research, landmark articles, and search for relevant medical research more easily. Docphin is available on the web, iOS, and Android.  Docphin was selected by Apple as one of the best new iOS apps in 2014. In 2016, the virtual healthcare platform, HealthTap, acquired DocPhin.

References

External links
 Docphin

Medical search engines